Adis Hodžić (born 16 January 1999) is a Slovenian footballer who plays as a defender.

Notes

References

1999 births
Living people
Slovenian footballers
Association football defenders
Slovenian expatriate footballers
Slovenia youth international footballers
Slovenia under-21 international footballers
Slovenian PrvaLiga players
Slovenian Second League players
NK Maribor players
ND Gorica players
Águilas FC players
FC Brașov (2021) players
Slovenian expatriate sportspeople in Spain
Expatriate footballers in Spain
Slovenian expatriate sportspeople in Romania
Expatriate footballers in Romania